Náměstí Republiky is a Prague Metro station on Line B in the Prague 1 district. Its two exits serve the Republic Square (Náměstí Republiky) area and the Masaryk suburban railway terminal (Praha Masarykovo nádraží) respectively. The station was opened on 2 November 1985, as part of the inaugural section of Line B between Sokolovská and Smíchovské nádraží.

References

Prague Metro stations
Railway stations opened in 1985
1985 establishments in Czechoslovakia
Railway stations in the Czech Republic opened in the 20th century